David L. Skeels (December 29, 1891 – December 2, 1926) was a baseball pitcher. He appeared in one game for the 1910 Detroit Tigers.

Skeels attended Gonzaga University, where he played college baseball for the Bulldogs in 1910.

References

External links

1891 births
1926 deaths
Detroit Tigers players
Gonzaga Bulldogs baseball players
Regina Bone Pilers players
Seattle Giants players
Edmonton Eskimos (baseball) players
Calgary Bronchos players
Major League Baseball pitchers
Baseball players from Washington (state)